Olga “Ollie” Burgoyne (June 13, 1878- April 2, 1974),  also known as Ollie Burgoyne-Calloway, was an American dancer, actress and businesswoman who gained popularity during the Harlem Renaissance. Although history has established Burgoyne as one of the lesser known African American figures in entertainment, she made her mark as one of the eight most significant and influential African American dancers and choreographers during this time (other notable mentions include: Katherine Dunham, Hemsley Winfield and Edna Guy.

Biography 
Burgoyne started her stage career in 1901 at the early age of six when she began performing in minstrel shows. In 1903, she performed in Vaudeville with the Seven Creole Girls and in her later career, continued to perform in this genre with her own company, the Burgoyne Musical Company. As her career progressed, she explored her vaudeville talents and mastered oriental dances internationally in Germany, Turkey, France, Denmark, Switzerland, Hungary, Egypt and Sweden.

Burgoyne continued to make a name for herself through song and dance during her eight year tour of Europe. She returned to the United States in 1909. Following 1909, she crossed the Atlantic 15 times before settling in Russia. There, she resided in St. Petersburg for 14 years. As she became a well known entertainer, she developed the reputation of a 'fire cracker". She was also given the opportunity to perform for the nobles of the country. While in Russia, she danced to earn a living. With her earnings, she purchased and owned an elegant lingerie shop called Maison Creole and employed 27 workers. Although famous for her performances, Burgoyne was also given the reputation of a stern business woman. In addition to this, other business credits include the management of Ward Calloway’s Hotel.

When she returned to the United States, her ‘exotic dancing’ such as The Snake Dance and the Brazilian and Spanish Dance trademarked as her most memorable movement qualities. As a result of the 'remarkable ease of her arm and hand motions as well as the gracefulness in her sways', theatrical critics have styled Burgoyne as “the peer of any dancer in the world regardless of color.

Important Contributions 

 Burgoyne joined the British-based cast of "In Dahomey"; an operetta written and performed by all black writers and entertainers. "In Dahomey" was the first full length musical to be performed at a major Broadway house. After its massive success, Burgoyne created an ongoing duet performance called "Duo Eclatant" with her partner Usher Watts.
 Louisiana Amazon Guards. In 1901, German Impresario, Mrs. Paula Kohn-Wollner assembled a group of seven women that made up the Louisiana Amazon Guards. This vaudeville troupe of black artists (six performers and one ‘reserve’) included Ollie Burgoyne, Fannie Smith, Emma Harris, Virginia Shepard and Coretty Alfred 一as well as a few other unknown members. The women traveled to Germany and booked their first performance with Herr Director A. Walter in Kiel. They were considered to be "the black Uberbrettl"

Additional Reviews:

“The Creole girl Bourgogne, an exotic beauty with sparkling eyes, a teint of soft bronze and dazzling white teeth, performs with a strange charm the favourite dance of her American home, the cake-walk..” -A.B, 6 October 1907

“...The pretty appearances of the six coloured ladies, and particularly their excellent voice material一a special mention is due to the splendid first soprano一 give the troupe the stamp of a unit which will cause a sensation in the world of variety. The many changing scenes which accommodate the need for both the serious and the comic are designed in such a clever and effective way that even the daughter from the girls school could be taken out to see the show. The costumes, the scenery and last not least the music一which latter has benefitted from the gifted hands of our Capellmeister Th. Walther一have been designed in such an elegant way that only words of highest praise could be used to describe them”. -Sfft- [=Seiffert], 21  July 21, 1901

“We have to admit it: We were surprised by the achievements of the American girls. We never expected so much charm and grace from the black ladies. The dance act really captivates the public but nevertheless decency has been maintained throughout…” -Sfft- [=Seiffert],  21 July 21, 1901

“...The young negresses are really one of the best song-and-dance ensembles of to-day…” -Viktor Happrich, 8 December 1901

There is no reference of the Louisiana Guards after 1902. Some suggest that the group may have changed its name. There is speculation that the group, "Louisiana Troupe" and/or The "5 Louisianas" may be an offspring of the original.

Broadway Features/Productions 
Burgoyne appeared in ten Broadway productions between 1926 and 1937. A few of her most well known credits include, “Tired Businessman”, “Lulu Bell” and “The Constant Sinner”.

Performance Credits and Notes

End of Life/Death 
In the later part of her life,  Burgoyne taught Russian dancers and worked in the movie industry with a small feature in the romantic comedy film, Laughter (1930). Her career spanned nearly 50 years and during this time, she made an extraordinary mark on the entertainment industry.

At the age of 95, Olga "Ollie" Burgoyne died on April 2, 1974 in Oxnard, California.

References

Further reading 

 “Ollie Burgoyne Danced Her Way From Chicago Into Hearts of Foreign Nobility.” Newspapers Publisher Extra (The Pittsburgh Courier. Last Modified September 29, 1923.

1878 births
1974 deaths
Actresses from Chicago
Harlem Renaissance
African-American actresses
20th-century American actresses
African-American female dancers
Music hall performers
20th-century African-American women
20th-century African-American people